LJ-001 is a broad-spectrum antiviral drug developed as a potential treatment for enveloped viruses. It acts as an inhibitor which blocks viral entry into host cells at a step after virus binding but before virus–cell fusion, and also irreversibly inactivates the virions themselves by generating reactive singlet oxygen molecules which damage the viral membrane. In cell culture tests in vitro, LJ-001 was able to block and disable a wide range of different viruses, including influenza A, filoviruses, poxviruses, arenaviruses, bunyaviruses, paramyxoviruses, flaviviruses, and HIV. Unfortunately LJ-001 itself was unsuitable for further development, as it has poor physiological stability and requires light for its antiviral mechanism to operate. However the discovery of this novel mechanism for blocking virus entry and disabling the virion particles has led to LJ-001 being used as a lead compound to develop a novel family of more effective antiviral drugs with improved properties.

See also 
 Brincidofovir
 BCX4430
 Favipiravir
 FGI-103
 FGI-104
 FGI-106

References 

Antiviral drugs
Abandoned drugs
Phenyl compounds
Furans
Thiazolidines
Allyl compounds